Killer toys are fictional characters based on toys, dolls or puppets that come alive and commit violent or scary acts. Reasons for these actions have included possession by demons, devils, monsters, ghosts, supernatural creatures, dark magic, and malevolent or malfunctioning technology.

List of films
The films that feature killer toys are listed as follows:

In television

 Evil dolls are antagonists in episodes of The Twilight Zone, both the 1959–1964 series and the 2002 version:
 1962: "The Dummy" (3.33) with a ventriloquist dummy that attempts to exact revenge when he is replaced
 1963: "Living Doll" (5.6) features Talky Tina (voiced by June Foray), a doll belonging to the stepdaughter of Erich Streator (played by Telly Savalas)
 1964: "Caesar and Me" (5.28) features a ventriloquist dummy that goads his owner into committing robberies and deserts him when the police come for him
 2002: "The Collection" features a young girl's strange collection of dolls which were made from her past babysitters
 The theme of evil toys has also been used in Doctor Who episodes:
 1966: "The Celestial Toymaker"
 2011: "Night Terrors"
 1986: Smurfs episode "Gargamel's Dummy," the series' antagonist Gargamel casts an evil spell on a ventriloquist's dummy Jokey Smurf had created for a talent show, hoping to use it to help him destroy the Smurf village and ultimately, the Smurfs. The dummy was a parody of Gargamel, and the real Gargamel, angered upon learning of it, casts the spell to begin exacting his revenge.
 1992: The Simpsons episode "Treehouse of Horror III", the segment "Clown Without Pity" features a Krusty doll that tries to kill Homer. The segment borrows elements from the Twilight Zone episode "Living Doll", the Child's Play films, Gremlins, the 1975 TV film Trilogy of Terror segment "Amelia" about a killer Zuni fetish doll as well as its 1996 cinematic sequel Trilogy of Terror II segment "He Who Kills", which are both in turn adaptations of Richard Matheson's 1969 short story, "Prey". The segment also borrows elements from Cape Fear. In a different episode, "The Ziff Who Came to Dinner", a possessed killer doll named "Baby Button Eyes" appears in a horror film, The Re-Deadening (a parody of Dolly Dearest). The doll is most likely based on the real-life appearance of "Annabelle", a possessed Raggedy Ann doll.
 1994: The Mega Man episode "Crime of the Century," Dr. Wily reprograms a bunch of dolls and other toys to perform robberies all over the city. However, it's all just a diversion so Wily can get his hands on something much more valuable: a giant black pearl.
 Rozen Maiden, anime about supernatural doll come to life with Rosa Mysticas.
 Ventriloquist dummies and dolls are also portrayed as evil in the works of R.L. Stine:
 1994: The Goosebumps books and TV series had the "Night of the Living Dummy" stories which featured a sentient ventriloquist dummy named Slappy.
 2010: R.L. Stine's The Haunting Hour featured Lilly D. in the episodes "Really You" Pt. 1 and 2 and "The Return of Lilly D".
 2014: R.L. Stine's The Haunting Hour features another killer toy in the episode "Near Mint Condition", which centers around Mangler, a rare cybernetic teddy bear from an '80s cartoon that was withdrawn from the market for allegedly killing and maiming its owners.
 2000: In the Sabrina: The Animated Series episode "Generation Hex", a rare collectible Billy-Go-Boom-Boom doll that the titular character purchases with extra fundraising money comes alive and takes her forty years into the future to warn her of the consequences of her selfishness.
 2003: In the What's New, Scooby Doo? episode "Toy Scary Boo," the gang investigates a store with living toys that are taking it over.
 2006: In The Adventures of Jimmy Neutron: Boy Genius episode "Flippy", Jimmy puts a chip in a dummy to help his father's ventriloquism act, only for it to go awry and steal from Hugh's brain to make the dummy sentient while leaving him a mindless zombie. Later, Flippy almost kills Hugh by throwing him off a cliff in order to keep his energy and stay alive.
 2013: In the Grojband episode "No Strings Attached," Trina Riffin suffers from pupaphobia after she had wicked visions of puppets when she was a child.
 2015: In the first episode of Ash vs Evil Dead, "El Jefe", the demonic forces attack Ash Williams at the supermarket where he works by possessing a "Little Lori" doll.
 Chucky, an American horror television series about a serial killer-possessed doll committing murders, which is based on the Child's Play franchise

List of episodes
The episodes that feature killer toys are listed as follows:

See also
 Haunted doll
 Uncanny valley

References

Films about toys
Stock characters
Dolls in fiction
Dummies and mannequins
Killer toys
Toy characters
Sentient toys in fiction
Fiction about toys
Horror fiction lists